Should Married Men Go Home? is a silent short subject co-directed by Leo McCarey and James Parrott starring comedy duo Laurel and Hardy. It was released by Metro-Goldwyn-Mayer on September 8, 1928.

Plot 
Ollie and his wife are enjoying a quiet Sunday at home until Stan shows up, eager to play some golf. After Stan breaks the chair, the blind, and nearly sets fire to their house, and Oliver breaks the Hardys' Victrola  Mrs. Hardy chases the boys out. At the golf course, they are partnered with a pair of young women to complete a foursome. The girls want to be treated to sodas, but the boys are short of money. Stan leaves his watch to settle the thirty-cent bill. On the course, they tangle with rude golfer Edgar Kennedy, and wind up in a mud-throwing battle with several other linksters.

Cast

Production notes 

Should Married Men Go Home? was filmed in March and May 1928. It was the first Hal Roach film to bill Laurel and Hardy as a team. Previous appearances together were billed under the Roach "All-Star Comedy" banner. On-location footage has recently surfaced on YouTube. The film's working title was Follow Through.

8-foot-9 actor John Aasen appears as "Very Tall Golfer."

The soda fountain routine was reworked during the sound era in the film Men O' War, with Jimmy Finlayson assumed the role inhabited by Charlie Hall.

The gag of Stan slipping a note under the door, only to see it get pulled further in from the inside where the Hardys are hiding from him, was reused during the sound era in Come Clean (1931) when the Hardys again pretend not to be home when the Laurels come calling.

Several oil derricks from the Los Angeles City Oil Field are visible during golf course scenes.

The lag time between the primary filming in March and the September release of Should Married Men Go Home? was unusually long. When the company reconvened in Los Angeles in Autumn 1928, the fame and popularity of the Laurel and Hardy team had grown.

Reception 
British film critic Leslie Halliwell gave the film a lukewarm reception, commenting that the "preliminary domestic scene is the funniest." while The Films of Laurel and Hardy author William K. Everson wrote in 1967 that the film was "one of the best of the "forgotten" Laurel and Hardy films, Should Married Men Go Home? admittedly overlaps with several other of their films but is no less funny because of it." He cites Ollie's collapsing of the front fence, the soda fountain routine and Edgar Kennedy's toupee woes as high spots.

References

External links 

 

1928 films
1928 comedy films
American black-and-white films
American silent short films
Films directed by James Parrott
Films directed by Leo McCarey
Films with screenplays by H. M. Walker
Golf films
Hal Roach Studios short films
Laurel and Hardy (film series)
1920s American films
Silent American comedy films